Mannalargenna, also spelt Manalakina (1770–1835), was a Palawa (Aboriginal Tasmanian) leader and warrior.

Biography
Mannalargenna (or was Manalakina)a Chief of the Plangermaireener clan in what is now the Ben Lomond tribal area of north-eastern Tasmania. He is described as being 5' 8" and wearing grease and red ochre all over his body. Following the arrival of British in the area, he led a series of guerrilla-style attacks against British settlers in the colony of Van Diemen's Land during the period known as the Black War. In 1829 he freed four Native women and a boy from John Batman's house where they had been held for a year.

While it seems as though he joined George Robinson's mission to persuade Native people to "surrender", it is claimed that he was actually directing Robinson away from the people. He was promised that if he helped Robinson he would not be sent to Flinders Island, but this promise was broken and he died in captivity at Wybalenna in 1835. When he arrived at Big Green Island in 1835, Mannalargenna symbolically cut off his ochred hair and beard.

Family 
Mannalargenna had two wives. His first wife's name is unknown, but together they had at least six children: a son, Neerhepeererminer, and daughters Nellenooremer, Woretermoeteyenner, Wottecowidyer, Wobbelty and Teekoolterme. His second wife was Tanleboneyer, with whom he had no children. She was one of George Robinson's early guides.

During his life, Mannalargenna's sister and four daughters were married to seamen from the Furneaux Islands and their babies were swapped around and documented incorrectly. Today, many Australian citizens claim a non-biological lineage through these colonially documented marriages.

Uncle Jack Charles (1943–2022) was his five times great-grandson, via his daughter Woretemoeteyenner (1797–1847).

Recognition and legacy 
"Mannalergenna Day" has been celebrated in early December in Little Musselroe Bay in Tasmania since 2015, in commemoration of Mannalargenna and for celebrating Parlevar culture.

There is a monument to Mannalargenna at Wybalenna Mission Site Cemetery.

A sketch of Mannalargenna by artist Thomas Bock is held in the British Museum in London, England.

See also 

 Dolly Dalrymple

References

Indigenous Tasmanian people
History of Australia (1788–1850)
Year of birth uncertain
1835 deaths
Australian Aboriginal elders